Boca Raton is a Tri-Rail commuter rail station in Boca Raton, Florida. The station is located at Yamato Road (SR 794), just east of Congress Avenue (SR 807) and west of I-95. Originally opened January 9, 1989, the station was moved and rebuilt following Hurricane Wilma, reopening to service November 4, 2005. The station is the southernmost Tri-Rail station in Palm Beach County, and offers parking. By 2014, it was considered the busiest station in the system with 1,600 riders a day, surpassing the Tri-Rail and Metrorail transfer station in Miami-Dade County. For this reason, a second Boca Raton Tri-Rail station at Glades Road has been long considered.

Station layout
The station has two side platforms, with a parking lot and bus loop west of the southbound platform. An overpass provides access to the northbound platform and the El Rio Trail, which provides direct pedestrian access to Yamato Road.

See also
Boca Raton station (Brightline)

References

External links

South Florida Regional Transportation Authority - Boca Raton station

Tri-Rail stations in Palm Beach County, Florida
Railway stations in the United States opened in 1989
Buildings and structures in Boca Raton, Florida
1989 establishments in Florida